Keith Callay Fitzhugh (born November 11, 1986) is a former American football safety who briefly was in the National Football League. He was signed by the New York Jets as an undrafted free agent in 2009. He played college football at Mississippi State.

High school
Keith graduated from Lovejoy High School in Hampton Georgia a semester early to attend Mississippi State University. He was the first recruit for Coach Sylvester Croom and chose Mississippi State.

College
In 2005, Keith played in 11 games as a true freshman making 13 tackles (including a tackle for loss). In 2006, Keith played in all 12 games and had 59 tackles and 1 interception. In 2007, Keith played in all 13 games and had 58 tackles, 5.5 Tackles for Loss, 1 Sack, and 2 Interceptions. In 2008, Keith played in all 12 games and had 50 tackles, 2.5 sacks and 1 interception
He was ranked the 12th best safety in the 2009 NFL Draft by NFL Draft Scout.

Professional career
Fitzhugh went undrafted in 2009 and tryouts with the Jets and Ravens were unsuccessful. On December 8, 2010, Fitzhugh declined an invitation to rejoin the Jets after injuries to safeties Jim Leonhard and James Ihedigbo, in order to provide a steady income for his parents.  His father is disabled and unable to work. He works as a conductor for the Norfolk Southern Railway in Atlanta.

Personal life
Keith currently resides in Hampton, Georgia with his father Keith Fitzhugh, Sr. and mother Meltonia Fitzhugh. Keith has an older brother named Toran and his sister Brittany died at the age of 14 from complications of the West Nile virus.

References

External links
Baltimore Ravens bio
Mississippi State Bulldogs bio
New York Jets bio
Keith's NFL Football Representation

1986 births
Living people
Players of American football from Jacksonville, Florida
American football safeties
Mississippi State Bulldogs football players
New York Jets players
Baltimore Ravens players
American railroaders
Norfolk Southern Railway people